Stanislav Gilyarovich Poplavsky (22 April 1902 – 10 August 1973) was a general in the Soviet and Polish armies.

Early life
Poplavsky was born in Imperial Russia, in Podolia. His family (his father's name was Hilary) was ethnically Polish, and in his younger years he considered himself a Pole.

In February 1920, he was drafted into the Red Army, and participated in the Russian Civil War. He was a member of the Communist Party of the Soviet Union from 1930 onwards.

Military career

Poplavsky served for the first three years (until 1923) as a private, then for four years (until 1927) as an NCO, company commander in the 297th Rifle Regiment. Over the next few years he attended an officer school, and afterwards received his own commands: first of a platoon in the 137th Rifle Regiment (1930–1931), then a platoon (1931–1933) and later a company in the School for Infantry Officers in Kharkov (1933–1935).

Before the Second World War he attended the Frunze Military Academy (1935–1938) where he became an instructor of military tactics (1938–1939) but in February 1939 he was relieved after a false accusation and given a manager's job at a sovkhoz in Tula region.

He returned to service shortly before the German invasion of the Soviet Union, as the head of the Operational Division of the Staff of the 162nd Rifle Division.

World War II
Poplavsky served as the commander of 720th Rifle Regiment (July–September 1941), and then Chief of Staff of 363rd Rifle Division (October 1941 – January 1942). During this time, he participated in the Białystok–Minsk and Smolensk battles. At the beginning of the Battle for Moscow, during the Vyazma and Bryansk defensive operation, his regiment was surrounded. But a few days later, on 6 October, he broke through the encirclement with a battle and withdrew his regiment along with several other units of the 19th Army. For distinctions in the battles of summer and autumn of 1941, he was awarded the Order of the Red Banner.
 
Poplavsky, who distinguished himself in a difficult situation, was immediately appointed with a promotion as chief of staff of the 363rd Rifle Division, which was hastily formed in the Ural Military District, and already in December entered the battle as part of the 30th Army of the Kalinin Front, and took part in the Klin-Solnechnogorsk offensive operation. In January 1942, he was appointed as the commander of the 185th Rifle Division. During the Rzhev-Vyazma operation, his unit was assigned to 29th Army, Kalinin Front. During the battle, his unit pulled ahead and was surrounded by enemy forces. A month later, his unit was in a complete encirclement. But with air supply, the unit managed to organize an active defense using the terrain conditions, prevented the destruction of the division and at the end of February 1942, it successfully broke through the front line to join the main army forces.

In May 1942, he was appointed as the commander of the 256th Rifle Division, which was assigned to the 39th Army, Kalinin Front. From 16 to 29 June, he was the chief of staff of the unit, and then was appointed commander of the 220th Rifle Division on the Kalinin and Western Fronts. During the Rzhev-Vyazma Offensive in March 1943, his division fought over 170 kilometers and crossed six rivers on the move, preventing German troops from gaining a foothold along their lines.

From June 1943 to September 1944, he commanded the  45th Rifle Corps in the Soviet 5th Army on the Western, 1st Belorussian and 3rd Belorussian Fronts. At the command of the corps, he participated in the Second Battle of Smolensk and Operation Bagration.

In September 1944 he was transferred to the Ludowe Wojsko Polskie (Polish People's Army) as one of the many Soviet officers who were to ensure that this allied formation remained loyal to communist ideals. As major general he commanded the Polish Second Army (26 September – 19 December 1944) and later the Polish First Army (until 10 September 1945). His units took parts in the breakthrough of the Pommernstellung (Pomerania Wall) fortification line, securing the Baltic Sea coast, crossing the Odra and Elbe rivers and the Battle of Berlin. He was wounded eight times in the war and showed high organizational skills in planning combat operations, and commanding troops. For his successful operations, he was noted 15 times in the orders of the Supreme Commander-in-Chief Joseph Stalin.

For skillful command and control of troops in breaking through enemy defenses on the Oder River and in the battles for Berlin on 29 May 1945, Poplavsky was awarded the title of Hero of the Soviet Union.

Post war

After the war he remained in the Polish army, along with thousands of other ethnically-Polish Soviet officers, including Konstantin Rokossovsky, who were put in charge of almost all Polish military units, either as commanding officers or as their advisors. Poplavsky served as commander of the Polish forces occupying Germany, later being commander of the Silesian Military District (until 22 November 1947), Chief Commander of the Polish Land Forces (until 21 March 1950), and General Inspector of Military Training (until 2 April 1949). He also held political positions: on 2 April 1949 he became the 2nd Deputy Minister of National Defence and later was Deputy Minister himself. He was also a deputy to the Polish Sejm (1947–1956), and from 1949 to 1956 he was a member of the Central Committee of the Polish United Workers Party (PZPR). On 12 August 1955 he was appointed General of the Soviet Army.

From 1947 to 1956, he was a member of the Legislative Sejm on behalf of the People's Party, later the Polish United Workers' Party, and then a member of the Sejm of the Polish People's Republic of the first term. On 1949, he became a member of the Central Committee of the Polish United Workers' Party. From 1953 to 1956, he was the president of the Supreme Hunting Council of the Polish Hunting Association. Poplavsky served as the president of the sports club Legia Warsaw, from 1950 to 1957.

In 1956 he was commander of the military forces responsible for the suppression of the Poznań 1956 protests. Afterwards, with the beginning of the era of destalinization, he (together with a significant number of other Soviet officers) left the Polish Army, which was granted slightly increased independence, and returned to the Soviet Union, where he became the 1st Deputy of the Chief Inspector of Military Training of the Soviet Army, and from 1958 an advisor to the inspectors-general of the Soviet Ministry of Defense.

He retired in 1963 with the rank of army general.

Personal life
Poplvasky was married to Maja Poplavska, née Terpilowska (1911–1991). They had a daughter, Izabela (1931–2011).

Poplavsky died on 10 August 1973 in Moscow. He was buried with full military honors at the Novodevichy Cemetery. His funeral was attended by a Polish delegation led by Minister of National Defense, General Wojciech Jaruzelski.

Dates of rank

Awards

:
 Order of Polonia Restituta (1st class)
 Order of Polonia Restituta (2nd class)
 Order of Polonia Restituta (3rd class)
 Virtuti Militari (Commander)
 Order of the Cross of Grunwald (2nd class)
 Order of the Banner of Work (1st class), twice
 Gold Cross of Merit, twice
 Silesian Uprising Cross
 Medal of Victory and Freedom 1945 
 Medal "For Oder, Neisse and the Baltic"
 Medal "For Warsaw 1939-1945"
 Medal "For Participation in the Battles for Berlin"
 Medal of the Armed Forces in the Service of the Fatherland (Silver medal)
 Medal of the Armed Forces in the Service of the Fatherland (Bronze medal)
 Medal of the 10th Anniversary of People's Poland
 Brotherhood of Arms Medal
 Wound Decoration (eight times)
:
 Hero of the Soviet Union (29 May 1945)
 3 Orders of Lenin (20 April 1942, 30 April 1945, 29 May 1945)
 Order of the October Revolution (22 February 1968)
 Order of the Red Banner, four times (9 August 1941, 30 January 1943, 3 November 1944, 13 June 1952)
 Order of Suvorov, 1st class (6 April 1945)
 Order of Suvorov, 2nd class (28 September 1943)
 Order of Kutuzov, 2nd class (9 April 1943)
 Order of Bogdan Khmelnitsky, 2nd class (4 July 1944)
 Order of the Red Star (22 February 1961)
 Medal "For the Defence of Moscow" (1944)
 Medal "For the Liberation of Warsaw" (1945)
 Medal "For the Capture of Berlin" (1945)
 Medal "For the Victory over Germany in the Great Patriotic War 1941–1945" (1945)
 Jubilee Medal "In Commemoration of the 100th Anniversary of the Birth of Vladimir Ilyich Lenin" (1969)
 Jubilee Medal "Twenty Years of Victory in the Great Patriotic War 1941-1945" (1965)
 Jubilee Medal "30 Years of the Soviet Army and Navy" (1948)
 Jubilee Medal "40 Years of the Armed Forces of the USSR" (1958)
 Jubilee Medal "50 Years of the Armed Forces of the USSR" (1968)
Other countries:
 Military Order of the White Lion, 1st class (Czechoslovakia)
 Gold Star of the Czechoslovak Military Order for Liberty  (Czechoslovakia)
 Distinguished Service Cross (United States)
 Order of Bravery (Yugoslavia)
  Order of the Partisan Star, 1st class (Yugoslavia)

Other honors
The Polish Army Officers' Training Center in Rembertów was named after Poplavsky from 1974 to 1989.
In 1973, a Primary School No. 3 in Żory was named in honor of him. On 12 October 1983, the Primary School No. 42 in Sosnowiec was also named after Poplavsky. The name remained until the 1990s.
From 1946 to 1950, a children's home in Woskowice Małe was named after Poplavsky. It was opened by the Namysłów branch of the Workers' Society of Friends of Children. The facility operated from 23 June 1946 to 1 September 1950.
On 28 June 1974, a B-438 semi-container ship was launched from the Lenin Shipyard in Gdańsk. The ship was named after MS "General Stanisław Popławski". In March 1998, the ship was retired and scrapped.
In 1976, a medal commemorating Poplavsky was issued by the Polish Mint.

Works
Author of memoirs Comrades of the front roads (or Comrades of the struggle; Polish title: Towarzysze frontowych dróg, Warszawa 1964, 1966, 1970, 1973, 1983; Russian title: Товарищи в борьбе, Moskwa 1963, 1974; German title: Kampfgefährten, Berlin 1980). The original title was to be On the land of forefathers (Na ziemi przodków, За землю предков), but it was changed by the censors.

Notes

External links
 Short biography on the page of Silesian Military District
Timeline of military career
 Comrades in the Struggle, memoirs of Poplavsky

Polish People's Army generals
Heroes of the Soviet Union
1902 births
1973 deaths
People from Vinnytsia Oblast
People from Mogilyovsky Uyezd (Podolian Governorate)
People from the Russian Empire of Polish descent
Ukrainian people of Polish descent
Soviet people of Polish descent
Polish United Workers' Party members
Members of the Polish Sejm 1947–1952
Members of the Polish Sejm 1952–1956
Army generals (Soviet Union)
Soviet officers in Polish Army 1943-1968
Polish military personnel of World War II
Soviet military personnel of World War II
Recipients of the Virtuti Militari (1943–1989)
Commanders of the Virtuti Militari
Recipients of the Order of Polonia Restituta (1944–1989)
Grand Crosses of the Order of Polonia Restituta
Recipients of the Order of the Banner of Work
Recipients of the Order of the Cross of Grunwald, 2nd class
Recipients of the Gold Cross of Merit (Poland)
Recipients of the Order of Lenin
Recipients of the Order of the Red Banner
Recipients of the Order of Suvorov, 1st class
Recipients of the Order of Kutuzov, 2nd class
Recipients of the Order of Bogdan Khmelnitsky (Soviet Union), 2nd class
Recipients of the Order of the Red Star
Recipients of the Military Order of the White Lion
Recipients of the Distinguished Service Cross (United States)
Recipients of the Order of Suvorov, 2nd class
Burials at Novodevichy Cemetery
Frunze Military Academy alumni